Gulley is the surname of:

 Alfred Gurdon Gulley (1848—1917), American professor of horticulture
 Annette Gulley (born 1964), Australian tennis player
 Catherine B. Gulley, English painter
 Jarmar Gulley (born 1991), American basketball player
 James Gulley (basketball) (born 1965), American basketball player
 James L. Gulley, American cancer researcher and Director of the Medical Oncology Service at National Cancer Institute
 Jim Gulley (1939–2014), American politician
 Justin Gulley (born 1993), New Zealand footballer
 Kellen Gulley (born 1994), American former soccer player
 Reg Gulley (born 1969), Australian politician
 Steve Gulley (1962–2020), American bluegrass singer-songwriter
 Tom Gulley (1899–1966), American baseball player
 Warren Gulley (1922–2012), American non-commissioned officer and first civilian chief of the White House Military Office
 Wib Gulley (born 1948), American politician and attorney

See also
 Gully (disambiguation)